Sergio Laganà (born 4 November 1982) is an Italian former professional road cyclist.

Major results
2008
 1st Stage 2 Tour Ivoirien de la Paix

References

External links

1982 births
Living people
Italian male cyclists
Sportspeople from Reggio Calabria
Cyclists from Calabria